Last Stand in Open Country may refer to:

Last Stand in Open Country (album), album by band Farm Dogs (which included Bernie Taupin)
"Last Stand in Open Country", song from Willie Nelson album The Great Divide